Chinimakhi (Dargwa: ЧIигIнимахьи) is a rural locality (a selo) in Burgimakmakhinsky Selsoviet, Akushinsky District, Republic of Dagestan, Russia. The population was 916 as of 2010. There are 3 streets.

Geography 
Chinimakhi is located 10 km east of Akusha (the district's administrative centre) by road. Chankalamakhi is the nearest rural locality.

References 

Rural localities in Akushinsky District